Sphaeranthus is a genus of Asian, African, and Australian plants in the tribe Inuleae within the family Asteraceae.

 Species

 formerly included
several species now in other genera: of Athroisma Pterocaulon 
 Sphaeranthus elongatus - Pterocaulon redolens
 Sphaeranthus erectus - Pterocaulon sphacelatum 
 Sphaeranthus laciniatus - Athroisma laciniatum
 Sphaeranthus gracilis - Athroisma gracile

References

Asteraceae genera
Inuleae